Surbhi Misra (born 9 August 1990) is an Indian female squash player. She replaced India's iconic squash player, Dipika Pallikal who was suffering from fever at the 2010 Commonwealth Games and competed in the women's singles event.

In 2010, she reached her career best ranking of 79 and became one of the strong contenders in the sport of squash. Surbhi founded the Surbhi Misra Sports Foundation in 2012 to uplift the ignored, hardworking sportspeople in India.

References 

1990 births
Living people
Indian female squash players
Squash players at the 2010 Commonwealth Games
Commonwealth Games competitors for India
21st-century Indian women
21st-century Indian people
Sportswomen from Rajasthan
Sportspeople from Jaipur